Suede is a type of soft, napped leather.

Suede may also refer to:

People
 Suede (singer), American pop and jazz singer
 Stephen "Suede" Baum (born 1970),  American fashion designer
 DJ Suede the Remix God  (born 1990), American music producer

Music
 Suede (album), English band's debut album, 1993
 Suede (band), an English rock band
 "Suede" (song), a song by NxWorries 
 "Suede", a song by Tori Amos from To Venus and Back

See also
 "Blue Suede Shoes", a rock-and-roll standard written and first recorded by Carl Perkins in 1955
 Swede (disambiguation)